Nominosuchus is a genus of protosuchian-grade crocodylomorph. It is known from several specimens discovered in ancient lake deposits of the Tithonian-age Upper Jurassic Tsagaantsav Formation, southwestern Mongolia. The type specimen is PIN 4174/4, a partial skull. It was similar to Shartegosuchus, and is assigned to the same family (Shartegosuchidae). Nominosuchus was described in 1996 by Mikhail Efimov, and the type species is N. matutinus.

References

Late Jurassic reptiles of Asia
Late Jurassic crocodylomorphs
Prehistoric pseudosuchian genera